Sofia Aparício (born 2 June 1970 in Viana do Castelo) is a Portuguese model and actress.

References

External links

Profile at Star.pt 

Portuguese female models
1970 births
Living people
Portuguese television presenters
Portuguese television actresses
People from Viana do Castelo
Portuguese women television presenters